Jackson Abugo  is a South Sudanese politician. As of 2011, he is the Advisor on Political Affairs for the state of Central Equatoria.

References

South Sudanese politicians
Living people
People from Central Equatoria
Year of birth missing (living people)
Place of birth missing (living people)